Vivienne Johnson is a retired English actress who is known for playing the supporting character of personal nurse to Young Mr. Grace in three seasons (1978-1981) of the British sitcom Are You Being Served?. She also appeared as Freda in Carry On England in 1976, and Marilyn in Odd Man Out opposite John Inman.

Screen roles

References

External links

 Agency profile

Living people
English television actresses
Year of birth missing (living people)
20th-century English actresses